Paulina was one of several Roman women related to Emperor Hadrian.

Paulina may also refer to:
 Paulina (given name), a name and list of people with this name

Places
 Paulina, Kuyavian-Pomeranian Voivodeship, Poland
 Paulina, Louisiana, U.S.
 Paulina, New Jersey, U.S.
 Paulina, Oregon, U.S.

Other uses
 Paulina (album), a 2000 album by Paulina Rubio
 Paulina (CTA), a station on the Chicago Transit Authority's Brown Line
 Paulina (film), a 2015 Argentine film
 Paulina (horse), won St Leger Stakes in 1807
 "Paulina" (song), a 1992 song by No Doubt
 Paulina (wife of Pammachius) (died c. 397), late Roman aristocrat and philanthropist

See also
 
 Paula (disambiguation)
 Pauline (disambiguation)
Pavlina